Michael Byers is a Northern Irish actor, best known for his portrayal of Liam in The Basil Brush Show. Having graduated from the University of St Andrews, his first television appearance was as Brendan Shepherd in Hollyoaks, before playing a fairy named Storm in several episodes of The Mysti Show on CBBC. Michael was then cast as Liam in The Basil Brush Show in 2006, replacing Mr Stephen as the wise-cracking fox's loyal sidekick and flatmate. Making his debut at the start of the fifth series, he has appeared in 26 episodes of the BAFTA-nominated show to date. In 2007, Michael worked with critically acclaimed director Stephen Poliakoff, starring as moody artist Zach in the BBC One film Capturing Mary, alongside Dame Maggie Smith, David Walliams, and Ruth Wilson (actress). Byers has also appeared in an advert for Richmond sausages.

Filmography

 2002–2003 – Hollyoaks – Brendan Shepherd
 2004 – The Mysti Show – Storm
 2006 – The Message – Boyfriend
 2007 – Capturing Mary – Zach
 2006–2007 – The Basil Brush Show – Liam
 2012 – A Human Vice – Edgar
 2012 – Holby City – Owen Maxwell
 2013 – Chuggington – Jackman (voice)
2019 – Doctors – Michael Byers

References

External links
http://www.sundaymail.co.uk/news/newsfeed/2007/11/04/basil-s-mate-will-not-swap-roles-78057-20058403/
http://www.imdb.com/name/nm2554071/

Living people
Alumni of the University of St Andrews
Male television actors from Northern Ireland
Year of birth missing (living people)